Cicendia is a small genus of plants in the gentian family which contains only two species of tiny yellow  annual wildflowers. Cicendia filiformis, the slender cicendia or yellow centaury, is native to Europe and naturalized in other places, such as Australia. Cicendia quadrangularis, the Oregon timwort, is native to western North America and South America.

Species
Cicendia filformis
Cicendia quadrangularis

External links
Jepson Manual Treatment
C. filiformis in South Australia
C. quadrangularis photos

Gentianaceae
Gentianaceae genera
Flora of Europe
Flora of California
Flora of Oregon
Taxa named by Michel Adanson